Singtel TV (formerly known as Singtel IPTV and mio TV) is a pay television service provided by Singtel in Singapore. It is transmitted through Singtel's broadband network via an IPTV platform which uses Ericsson Mediaroom (originally developed by Microsoft) as its end-to-end software platform. It is a service that allows multimedia content – including linear channels and on-demand content – to be viewed on any television set. The internet protocol television service utilises IP set-top boxes (STBs), connected through Singtel optical fibre broadband service. The Singtel TV IPTV network currently has more than 425,000 subscribers. Singtel TV is Singtel's integrated gateway for home users upon which the company is delivering multiple IP-based communication services.

Television channels

Free-to-air

Complimentary

Sports / news

Kids / education / lifestyle

Education / entertainment / christian

Movies

Chinese

Indian

Malay / Filipino / international

On Demand

Upcoming channels
N/A

Set-top boxes 
Singtel TV offers the following set-top boxes:

Discontinued

 Motorola (ARRIS) HD VIP1200 non-DVR (1 Gen)
 Motorola (ARRIS) HD VIP1208 DVR (1 Gen)

Current

 Tatung STB-2300 HD non-DVR
 Tatung STB-3102 HD non-DVR
 Tatung STB-3002 HD DVR with 500GB HDD
 Cisco (Technicolor) ISB2200 HD non-DVR (2 Gen)
 Cisco (Technicolor) ISB2230 HD DVR with 500GB HDD (2 Gen)
 ARRIS VIP4402E HD non-DVR (3 Gen)
 ARRIS VIP5662W 4K DVR with 1TB HDD (3 Gen)

References

External links
 Singtel TV Official Website
 Singtel TV Programme Guide
 Singtel TV Channel Listing

2007 establishments in Singapore
Broadcasting in Singapore